Nesco (also called New Columbia) is an unincorporated community in Mullica Township, Atlantic County, New Jersey, United States.

The New Columbia-Nesco United Methodist Church is located there.  The Nesco School is located west of the settlement.

Demographics

History
A historic plaque is located at the Indian Cabin Mill Inn in Nesco, where fugitive Joe Mulliner—the "Robin Hood of the Pines"—surrendered to authorities.  Mulliner had settled in nearby Pleasant Mills, but was forced to flee after remaining loyal to England in the Revolutionary War.  Mulliner and 40 others formed a gang and hid on an island in the nearby Mullica River, from where they launched criminal attacks. The gang would rob local residents, but were noted for their lack of violence and for not robbing the poor.  Following Mulliner's capture at the Indian Cabin Mill Inn, he was tried in Burlington in 1781, and then hanged.

A glass manufacturing plant opened in New Columbia in 1845.

In the 1880 census, the population of New Columbia was 96.

New Columbia had a post office by 1892.

The settlement's name changed to "Nesco" in 1897.

References

Mullica Township, New Jersey
Unincorporated communities in Atlantic County, New Jersey
Unincorporated communities in New Jersey